State Road 410 (NM 410) is a  state highway in the US state of New Mexico. NM 410's western terminus is at NM 406 northeast of Seneca, and the eastern terminus is a continuation as Oklahoma State Line Road at the Oklahoma/ New Mexico border.

Major intersections

See also

References

410
Transportation in Union County, New Mexico